John Bradley may refer to:

Entertainment 
J. Robert Bradley (1919–2007), American gospel singer
John Bradley (American actor) (born 1960), American television actor
John Bradley (English actor) (born 1988), British actor from Game of Thrones

Sports 
Jack Bradley (baseball) (1893–1969), American baseball player
Jack Bradley (footballer) (1916–2002), English footballer
John Bradley (Australian footballer) (born 1943), Australian rules footballer for Footscray
John Bradley (drag racer) (1925–2012), American drag racer and land speed racer

Military 
Jack T. Bradley (1918–2000), United States Army Air Forces pilot
John Bradley (RAF officer) (1888–1982)
John Bradley (United States Navy) (1923–1994), Navy Cross recipient, WW II
John A. Bradley (born c. 1945), United States Air Force lieutenant general 
John Jewsbury Bradley (1869–1948), United States Army officer

Other 
John Bradley (ironmaster) (1769–1816), English industrialist who set up the Stourbridge Ironworks
John Bradley (d. 1844) (1787–1844), British artist and drawing-master to the Brontës
John Bradley (artist) ( 1830–1840), British-American artist
John Bradley (Wisconsin politician) (1817–1902), Republican member of the Wisconsin State Assembly
John Bradley (bishop), 16th-century English bishop
John Bradley (doctor) (1917–2004), Canadian doctor
John Bradley (Australian politician) (1844–1900), Australian politician
John Courtland Bradley (1887–1964), physician and politician in Ontario, Canada
John E. Bradley (born 1971), Democratic member of the Illinois House of Representatives
John J. Bradley (1831–1891), New York politician
John R. Bradley (born 1970), British author and journalist
John Bradley (historian) (1954–2014), Irish historian

See also
Jon Bradley (born 1981), American football player
John Bradley & Co, proprietors of the Stourbridge ironworks